Adamsville is an unincorporated community in Sumner County, Kansas, United States.  It is located about 4 miles north of Geuda Springs at 0.5 mile west of the intersection of S Oxford Rd and E 80th St, next to an abandoned railroad.

History
A post office was opened in Adamsville in 1925, and remained in operation until it was discontinued in 1931.

A railroad previously passed through the community, north to south, from Oxford to Geuda Springs.

Education
The community is served by Oxford USD 358 public school district.

References

Further reading

External links
 Sumner County map, KDOT

Unincorporated communities in Sumner County, Kansas
Unincorporated communities in Kansas